Antalina Manor is a former residential manor in Antalina village, Anykščiai district.

References

Manor houses in Lithuania